BPM 37093 (V886 Centauri) is a variable white dwarf star of the DAV, or ZZ Ceti, type, with a hydrogen atmosphere and an unusually high mass of approximately 1.1 times the Sun's. Like other white dwarfs, BPM 37093 is thought to be composed primarily of carbon and oxygen, which are created by thermonuclear fusion of helium nuclei in the triple-alpha process.

Structure
In the 1960s, it was predicted that as a white dwarf cools, its material should crystallize, starting at the center. When a star pulsates, observing its pulsations gives information about its structure. BPM 37093 was first observed to be a pulsating variable in 1992, and in 1995 it was pointed out that this yielded a potential test of the crystallization theory. In 2004, Antonio Kanaan and a team of researchers of the Whole Earth Telescope estimated, on the basis of these asteroseismological observations, that approximately 90% of the mass of BPM 37093 had crystallized. Other work gives a crystallized mass fraction of between 32% and 82%. Any of these estimates would result in a total crystalline mass in excess of 5 kilograms.

Crystallization of the material of a white dwarf of this type is thought to result in a body-centered cubic lattice of carbon and/or oxygen nuclei, which are surrounded by a Fermi sea of electrons.

Nickname and press coverage
Since a diamond also consists of crystallized carbon, the star BPM 37093 has been nicknamed Lucy after the Beatles' hit Lucy in the Sky with Diamonds.

In popular culture
In John C. Wright's science fiction novel Count to a Trillion and its sequels, V886 Centauri is called the "Diamond Star", after the crystalline carbon core. In the story of the novel, it becomes the destination of the first human interstellar journey after it is discovered that the star, a ten-decillion-carat diamond of degenerate matter, is not matter at all, but antimatter. An alien artifact called "The Monument" is found orbiting it, which increases human knowledge of mathematics immensely.
In Jim Jarmusch's 2013 film Only Lovers Left Alive, Tilda Swinton's character Eve tells Tom Hiddleston's character Adam about BPM 37093, describing it as a "diamond up there the size of a planet" that "emits the music of a gigantic gong."
The webcomic Abstruse Goose provides a brief fictionalized account of the discovery of the carbon core's crystalization (with the addition of some raccoons to the story), "Cosmic Backyard."

See also 
 List of star extremes
 Extraterrestrial diamonds
 Cullinan Diamond, the largest diamond found on Earth

References

External links 
 BPM 37093 (Diamond Star)
 Largest diamond in galaxy predicts future of solar system, Pravda.ru, December 26, 2007.

Centaurus (constellation)
Pulsating white dwarfs
Centauri, V886